Sir Talbot Bowes (1560 – 14 February 1638) was an English politician who sat in the House of Commons at various times between 1593 and 1629.

Bowes was the son of Sir George Bowes and his second wife and was baptised on 25 November 1560. He was admitted at Gray's Inn in 1579.  In 1593, he was elected Member of Parliament for Richmond. He was commissioner for musters for North Riding of Yorkshire in 1585 and commissioner for recusancy in 1596.   He was alderman (mayor) of Richmond from 1598 to 1599. In 1601 he was elected MP for Richmond again. He was re-elected MP for Richmond in 1604.  In 1611 he succeeded his half-brother Sir William Bowes to the estates of  Barnard Castle. He was re-elected MP for Richmond in 1614. He was knighted in 1617. In 1621 he was re-elected MP for Richmond. He was alderman of Richmond again from 1624 to 1625. In 1625 he was re-elected MP for Richmond. He was last elected MP for Richmond in 1628 and sat until 1629 when King Charles decided to rule without parliament for eleven years. 
 
Bowes died at the age of 77 and was buried at Barnard Castle.

Bowes married Agnes Warcop, daughter of Thomas Warcop of Smardale, Westmorland.  He was half brother to  Sir William Bowes and Robert Bowes.

References

1560 births
1638 deaths
English MPs 1593
English MPs 1601
English MPs 1604–1611
English MPs 1614
English MPs 1621–1622
English MPs 1625
English MPs 1628–1629